Stanley George Payne (born September 9, 1934) is an American historian of modern Spain and European Fascism at the University of Wisconsin–Madison. He retired from full-time teaching in 2004 and is currently Professor Emeritus at its Department of History.

Work
Known for his typological description of fascism, Payne is a specialist in the Spanish fascist movement and has also produced comparative analyses of Western European fascism. He asserts that there were some specific ways in which Nazism paralleled Russian communism to a much greater degree than Fascism was capable of doing. Payne does not propound the theory of "red fascism" or the notion that communism and Nazism are essentially the same. He states that Nazism more nearly paralleled Russian communism than any other noncommunist system has.

In the 1960s, his books were published in Spanish by Éditions Ruedo ibérico (ERi), a publishing company set up by Spanish Republican exiles in Paris, France, to publish works forbidden in Spain by the Francoist regime ruling the country at the time. He has been referred to by some historians as a revisionist due to his views. One of his more famous books is Spanish Civil War, The Soviet Union and Communism, which analyzes Joseph Stalin and the Soviet government's intervention in Spain.  He also wrote The Franco Regime, The Spanish Civil War and A History of Fascism 1914–1945.

Payne uses a lengthy itemized list of characteristics to identify fascism, including the creation of an authoritarian state; a regulated, state-integrated economic sector; fascist symbolism; anti-liberalism; anti-communism, and anti-conservatism. He sees elimination of the autonomy or, in some cases, complete existence of large-scale capitalism as the common aim of all fascist movements.

Education
Payne received his bachelor's degree from Pacific Union College in 1955. He went on to earn a masters from Claremont Graduate School and University Center in 1957 and a doctorate (Ph.D.) from Columbia University in 1960.

Books

 Falange: A History of Spanish Fascism, 1961
 Politics and the Military in Modern Spain, 1967
 Franco's Spain, 1967
 The Spanish Revolution, 1970
 A History of Spain and Portugal (2 vol 1973) full text online free vol 1 before 1700; full text online free vol 2 after 1700; standard scholarly history
 Basque Nationalism, 1975
 La revolución y la guerra civil española, 1976
 Fascism: Comparison and Definition, 1980
 Spanish Catholicism: An Historical Overview, 1984
 The Franco Regime 1936–1975, 1988
 Franco: El perfil de la historia, 1992
 Spain's First Democracy: The Second Republic, 1931–1936, 1993
 A History of Fascism 1914–1945, 1996
 El primer franquismo, 1939–1959: Los años de la autarquía, 1998
 Fascism in Spain 1923–1977, 2000
 The Spanish Civil War, the Soviet Union, and Communism 1931–1939, 2004

 El colapso de la República: Los orígenes de la Guerra Civil 1933-1936, 2005
 The Collapse of the Spanish Republic, 1933–1936, 2006
 40 preguntas fundamentales sobre la Guerra Civil, 2006
 Franco and Hitler: Spain, Germany, and World War II, 2008
 ¿Por qué la República perdió la guerra?, 2010
 Spain: A Unique History, 2011
 Civil War in Europe, 1905-1949, 2011
 La Europa revolucionaria: Las guerras civiles que marcaron el siglo XX, 2011
 The Spanish Civil War, 2012
 Franco: A Personal and Political Biography, 2014, with Jesús Palacios
 Franco: Una biografía personal y política, 2014, with Jesús Palacios
 El fascismo, 2014
 La Guerra Civil Española, 2014
 El camino al 18 de julio: La erosión de la democracia en España, diciembre de 1935 - julio de 1936, 2016
 365 momentos clave de la historia de España, 2016
 En defensa de España : desmontando mitos y leyendas negras, 2017
 La revolución española, 1936-1939: Un estudio sobre la singularidad de la Guerra Civil, 2019

References

External links

  
 

1934 births
Living people
21st-century American historians
21st-century American male writers
Academics and writers on far-right extremism
American Hispanists
Claremont Graduate University alumni
Columbia Graduate School of Arts and Sciences alumni
Historians of fascism
Historians of Francoist Spain
Historians of the Second Spanish Republic
Historians of the Spanish Civil War
Pacific Union College alumni
People from Denton, Texas
University of Wisconsin–Madison faculty
Corresponding members of the Real Academia de la Historia
Academic journal editors
Historians of carlism
Historians from Texas
Historians from California
American male non-fiction writers